Vasil Gruev (born 23 November 1926) was a Bulgarian cross-country skier who competed in the 1950s. He finished 49th in the 18 km event at the 1952 Winter Olympics in Oslo.

External links
18 km Olympic cross country results: 1948-52
  

1926 births
Possibly living people
Bulgarian male cross-country skiers
Olympic cross-country skiers of Bulgaria
Cross-country skiers at the 1952 Winter Olympics